Robert Edward Maury (born February 24, 1958), known as The Tipster Killer, is an American serial killer and rapist who strangled to death at least three women in Shasta County, California, between 1985 and 1987. After each murder, Maury called into a tip line to tell detectives where the bodies were located, contributing to his nickname.

Early life 
Robert Edward Maury was born in Del Norte County, California on February 24, 1958. It is alleged that he had an abusive father. Before his arrest, he lived in Cottonwood and occasionally worked as a landscaper and a dried-flower arranger.

Murders

Averill D. Weeden 
On August 8, 1985, 48-year-old Averill Deanna Weeden, who rented a room to Maury, was found dead partially buried along Bechelli Lane near South Bonnyview Road in Redding. She was reported missing on May 25. She had died of strangulation and contained multiple skull fractures. Police had been led to her body due to an anonymous caller tipping off the location to the Secret Witness Program of Shasta County. Due to Maury's relations to Weeden, he was considered a suspect, but no other evidence linked him to the murder, and he was not arrested.

Belinda Jo Stark 
On August 17, 1987, the skeletal remains of 30-year-old Belinda Jo Stark, who had been missing since June 26, were found in a remote bushy area near Palm Avenue and Monte Vista Road. She had been raped and strangled to death. She was not immediately identified but was later identified through the numerous tattoos on her body. Her body had been located due to an anonymous caller who had tipped authorities.

Dawn M. Berryhill 
On September 22, 1987, the body of 20-year-old Dawn Marie Berryhill was found in a remote bushy area approximately 250 yards from where Stark was found. She had last been seen on June 22 when she left her 6-month-old son with a friend. Due to the level of decomposition on the body, she had to be identified through dental records. An autopsy showed Berryhill had been strangled to death with a bootlace. Her body was found due to an anonymous caller tipping off the police. Police speculated that the killings of Berryhill and Stark could have been connected due to the proximity they were found and the fact both had disappeared days apart.

Suspected victims 
On August 4, 1983, the nude body of Lora Stewart, 44, was found in Battle Creek near Cottonwood. She had been strangled to death. She was a waitress at Jerry's Restaurant on Cypress Avenue in Redding. Maury has been considered a possible suspect in her murder but never charged. 

On October 5, 1983, the body of Redding businesswoman Helen Faye Generes, 63, was found on the floor her Market Street real estate office, in Redding. She too had been strangled to death.

In later years, Maury requested that some of his property be returned to his family so they could sell it off. However, officials would deny all requests and said that his property could have held evidence of other victims. So far, he has not been definitively linked to any other crimes.

Arrest 
Maury was investigated as a suspect in September 1987 after it was suspected he had been the caller in the three murder cases and had received $2,000 in return. It was found that Maury had bought a motorcycle with the money and paid off some of his family's debts. Fire Marshall Roy Del Carlo, who was wired, posed as the chairman of the Secret Witness board and met with Maury in a series of meetings. His voice was compared to the caller who had called to report the bodies, and they were found to have been eerily similar. Maury's fingerprints also matched a fingerprint left on an envelope that contained Secret Witness reward money. More evidence emerged that physically linked Maury to Stark's murder, as a fingerprint found inside her purse matched Maury's prints.

Maury was arrested at his home on November 7, 1987, under suspicion of committing the murders. Maury was held at $750,000 bail awaiting charges, which was later changed to no bail once he was charged with three counts of first-degree murder and was additionally charged with raping a woman in August. Maury pleaded innocent and said he merely witnessed one of the killings. He also said revealing his identity violated his rights.

Trial and later life 
The defense argued during the trial that Maury accidentally discovered the bodies and reported them as a good Samaritan. A jury found him guilty of all three murders, and Maury told them to sentence him to death if they truly thought he was guilty, to which they did. 

In 2003, Maury attempted to appeal his sentence because multiple errors occurred during the trial, including the fact the jury had been told about his calls to the hotline, something that the Secret Witness Program, which had promised to keep his identity private, violated his 4th amendment rights. The court stated however that the program is allowed to pass on the information to law enforcement who are involved in an investigation, and so, the appeal was rejected, and he remained on death row.

Capital punishment in California remains in a state of limbo following multiple ballot initiatives and a moratorium imposed by Governor Gavin Newsom, and executions have not been fulfilled in California since 2006, so, as of 2023, Maury is still awaiting execution at San Quentin State Prison is San Quentin, California.

See also 
 List of death row inmates in the United States
 List of serial killers in the United States

External links 
 CDCR Inmate Information

References 

1958 births
1985 murders in the United States
1987 murders in the United States
20th-century American criminals
American male criminals
American people convicted of murder
American prisoners and detainees
American prisoners sentenced to death
American serial killers
Criminals from California
Living people
Male serial killers
People convicted of murder by California
Prisoners and detainees of California
Prisoners sentenced to death by California
Violence against women in the United States